Fissidens usambaricus is a species of moss belonging to the family Fissidentaceae. It is known from Sub-Saharan Africa. In Angola, it has been reported to grow in lowland rainforests.

References

Dicranales
Flora of Angola
Plants described in 1894